Prudential Family Playhouse is an American anthology drama series that aired on live CBS from October 1950 to March 1951. Sponsored by Prudential Insurance, the series features actors in adaptations of Broadway plays or best selling novels.

Among its stars were Eva Marie Saint, Grace Kelly, Jessica Tandy, Helen Hayes, Kay Francis, Kevin McCarthy (actor), Dorothy Gish, Gertrude Lawrence, and Bert Lahr. Its writers included playwrights George Abbott, Robert Anderson, Ruth Gordon, and Sidney Howard.

Production notes
The series was broadcast live from New York City. It broadcast in only twelve cities across the United States because the writers of the properties used in the series refused to allow the show to be broadcast using kinescope.

Prudential Family Playhouse aired on alternate Tuesdays opposite the highly rated Texaco Star Theater, hosted by Milton Berle. As a result, the series struggled in the ratings. In February 1951, CBS announced that they were canceling the series. The final episode aired on March 27, 1951.

References

External links

Prudential Family Playhouse at CVTA with episode list

1950 American television series debuts
1951 American television series endings
1950s American anthology television series
1950s American drama television series
Black-and-white American television shows
CBS original programming
English-language television shows
American live television series
Television shows filmed in New York (state)